Les Noces de Pierrette (English:The marriage of Pierrette) is a 1905 painting by the Spanish artist and sculptor Pablo Picasso. While belonging chronologically to Picasso's Rose Period, it is artistically characteristic of the Blue Period, when the artist faced poverty and depression following the suicide of his friend Carlos Casagemas in 1901.

Sales history
The painting was acquired in 1907 by Josef Stránský, an art dealer and a friend of Picasso's. From 1945 to 1962, the painting was owned by Picasso's son Paulo Picasso.

Around 1930, Georges Renand, owner of La Samaritaine department store, purchased the work. The painting was owned by the Swedish investment banker and merchant Fredrik Roos when it was sold at Binoche et Godeau in Paris on November 30, 1989. The buyer, Tomonori Tsurumaki, a real-estate developer, investment banker and owner of Autopolis racetrack, purchased the painting for the sum of $51,670,000, making it one of the world's most expensive paintings.

With the collapse of Tsurumaki's company, Nippon Tri-Trust, the painting ended up in the hands of the construction company Hazama, which had constructed Tsurumaki's racetrack. Hazama, having run into financial difficulties, put the painting up as collateral when the firm took a loan from Lake Credit Company. Thus, Lake Credit Company came into possession of  Les Noces de Pierrette. When Lake Credit Company sold its stake in the mainline consumer loan business to GE Capital,  Les Noces de Pierrette (along with 500 other paintings worth approximately $200 million) became the property of GE Capital. Presently, Les Noces de Pierrette is secured in the vault of Sumitomo Mitsui Trust Holdings (formerly the Mitsui Trust Bank).  It was offered at $54 million in 1994 with no takers, and again, also with no takers in 1997 at $35 million. The Japanese operation of GE Capital was subsequently sold to Shinsei Bank in 2008, along with its art collection portfolio.

See also
Picasso's Blue Period
Picasso's Rose Period
List of most expensive paintings

References

Paintings by Pablo Picasso
1905 paintings
Paintings in Japan